The Reggiane Re.2005  (Sagittarius) was an Italian monoplane fighter and fighter-bomber produced for the Regia Aeronautica during the later years of World War II. Along with the Macchi C.202/C.205 and Fiat G.55, the Reggiane Re.2005 was one of the three Serie 5 Italian fighters. The lines of the fuselage were aerodynamically efficient, and the design was intended to exploit the famous Daimler-Benz DB 605 engine. The only drawback was a certain structural weakness in the rear section of the fuselage. Only 48 examples had been delivered before the Armistice, and these fighters took part in the defence of Naples, Rome and Sicily, with the survivors battling above the crumbling ruins of Berlin, in German insignia. British ace and military observer, Group Captain Duncan Smith, DSO DFC, said that "The Re.2005 was altogether a superb, potent aeroplane".

Design and development
The Reggiane 2005 was the last of the Reggiane aircraft line to be built during World War II. The project which started in 1941 was carried out by a team led by Roberto Longhi with the designers Alessio, Maraschini, Toniolo and Pozzi. Preliminary work was completed before the end of the year despite being a new project and not the development of an existing design such as the Reggiane Re.2002. The DB 605 engine was waiting to be delivered when the airframe was ready in February 1942. The new machine was not only rated as one of the best Axis wartime aircraft but also one of the best, if not the best-looking. Its semi-elliptical wings, long nose and large tail were all distinctive features of this small, nimble fighter.

The prototype MM.494 first flew 9 May 1942 but, the day after, a heavy landing led to an undercarriage failure which caused serious damage, and the aircraft was grounded until June (MM.494 was damaged twice more in tests). This prototype had four Breda 12.7 mm machine guns and one Mauser cannon and was primarily used for testing and then for the aerial defense of Naples. After a fierce competition, in which the C.205N was quickly abandoned and the G.55 was considered better from a production point of view (being only marginally inferior as a fighter but much easier to mass produce), the Regia Aeronautica ordered the production of 750 Re.2005 aircraft, an optimistic figure in wartime Italy.

Technical design

The Re.2005 was a low-wing, single-engine, single-seat fighter monoplane, made of light alloys. Propulsion was by a  Daimler Benz DB.605A-1 engine, either of original German production or built by Fiat as the RA.1050 RC.58 Tifone (Typhoon). The aircraft had a right-handed, three-bladed Piaggio P.2001 constant speed, mechanically controlled, variable-pitch metal propeller. The streamlined but tiny fuselage was almost totally dominated by the DB 605 engine with little room for fuel storage. The fuselage-mounted MG 151/20 cannon had less ammunition than those mounted in the wings (150 rounds versus 170 rounds in the wing gun bays from the second prototype on). The comparable Fiat G.55 had 250 rounds for the fuselage gun but also 600 for a 12.7 mm machine gun. The smaller Re.2005 also carried 100 fewer 20 mm but 100 more 12.7 mm rounds, a lighter armament array.

The aft fuselage was unusually small, even by Italian standards and contained the radio equipment, oxygen bottles and supported the relatively large fin. The cockpit was covered by a canopy which tilted to the right for access and had an armoured 50 mm glass windscreen. Other protection included a seat with -thick steel shell weighing . The seat provided little protection against 12.7 mm rounds which were capable of piercing even  at short distances but the armour was tempered, giving more protection than homogeneous steel.  Given the heavy weight of a thick steel plate, every attempt was made to make the steel alloy used stronger and a headrest was attached to bulkhead six.

The sophisticated wing design, often described as elliptical, was semi-elliptical, with wing thickness tapering from 15 percent at the root to 8 percent at the tip. The structure of the three spars incorporated a "T" section. The triangular-shaped wing and tail control surfaces were mostly fabric-covered, included all-metal two-part split flaps and statically balanced ailerons. The wide-track undercarriage retracted outwards into the wings and the tailwheel was fully retractable. The Re.2005 was the only Italian aircraft of the war to have hydraulically activated flaps. The Re.2005 was one of the most advanced Italian fighters but it was also too advanced to be made by the Italian industry and one of the most expensive, if not the most expensive to produce. The complexity of the Re.2005 design and small dimensions led to the Fiat G.55, being evaluated as a superior choice for mass production.

Operational history

The first pilot to use the Re. 2005 in action was Maggiore Vittorio Minguzzi, commander of 22° Gruppo. The unit was based  at Napoli-Capodichino airfield for the defense of the city. Minguzzi received the prototype of the Re.2005 (MM.494)—after flight test evaluations in Guidonia—and  made the first flight with this aircraft on 7 March 1943. He and the most able pilots in the Gruppo flew this prototype until 23 March and they all had a very favourable and enthusiastic impression of it. He then took it to Napoli-Capodichino where it was incorporated into 362a Squadriglia. This unit—commanded by Capitano Germano La Ferla—was the first to be equipped with the Re.2005.

Minguzzi scrambled for the first time in the Sagittario on 24 March, when Naples was attacked and on 2 April he claimed a four-engined B-24 Liberator bomber over the Isle of Ischia. This claim is not verified against corresponding USAAF losses. Italian ace Vittorio Minguzzi was impressed by this aircraft following its tests and combat debut on 2 April 1943. He wrote

This statement provides a realistic comparison between the two aircraft: in theoretical speed, the Macchi C.202 was only  slower but the Re.2005 with the DB-605 engine and larger wing, provided a substantial improvement in performance at high altitude (the difference was less marked at medium-to-low altitudes, as the comparison with the C.205V showed). During April, 362a Squadriglia received three more Re.2005s from the 0-serie but the number of Re.2005s in the 22° Gruppo never exceeded eight.

The first confirmed air victories came on 28 April, when four Re.2005s from 22° Gruppo scrambled (with C.202s and one Dewoitine D.520) from Capodichino to intercept a formation of 30 B-24s Liberators, escorted by 30 fighters heading for Naples. The Re.2005s were flown by Maggiore Minguzzi, Capitano La Ferla, Tenente Giulio Torresi and Sergente Donati. The 22o Gruppo claimed one B-24 (by Minguzzi) and four probables (one was later confirmed by ground observer and credited to Donati). Ten more were claimed as shared damaged by the whole Gruppo.

More aircraft arrived at 362a Squadriglia and in the following weeks, this unit displayed a lot more potency than C.202 units, claiming several bombers for the loss of a pair of Re.2005s. By 25 June 1943, Reggiane Re.2005 pilots claimed a total of seven B-24s and many others damaged but losses claimed seldom matched true losses. (See for example the passage in the entry for Macchi C.205 describing the Battle of Capo Pula on 2 August, when none of the 12 P-38 Lightnings claimed were lost by the USAAF, whereas the Americans claimed three or four victories over the Axis fighters with no losses. Later records showed that only a Catalina and a C.202 were shot down.) At least one Reggiane, MM.092343 of Lt. Moresi, was shot down.

On 2 July 1943, 362a was sent to Sicily to face the imminent invasion and were involved in combat with Spitfires, claiming five shot down from 11 to 14 July (two were confirmed kills: a reconnaissance Spitfire and another downed in a strafing attack over Comiso). Spitfires were formidable opponents (even if many were only Mk Vs), with two Re.2005s destroyed on 11 July and the rest bombed or strafed on the ground. Only two aircraft returned to Sicily.

Ten more fighters joined 362a but when one was damaged in a steep dive on 21 August 1943, some concern was raised. On 25 August, MM.092356 (Lt Dario Signorini bailed out) was lost during another dive and so further flights were discontinued. It was discovered that at speeds over  TAS, every manoeuvre could adversely affect the flight control in the tail and then cause damage to the fuselage from flutter. Re.2005 pilots were forbidden from attaining very high speeds (VNE ) but by then, operations were winding down as the Armistice was taking effect.

The MM.494 prototype fitted with a DB 605 had a recorded speed of  when flown fully equipped but this speed was attained by levelling the aircraft after a dive. The Re.2005 had good handling in dogfights and according to General Minguzzi, who flew both the Re.2005 and the Spitfire, the Re. 2005 was even better than the Spitfire in tight turns and handling..

One of the few examples of combat reports, dated 11 July 1943, seems to contradict Minguzzi's statement, when together with other Italian fighters, Eugenio Salvi's Re.2005 fought against Spitfires over Sicily. A Spitfire Mk V latched onto the tail of Salvi's Re.2005. Salvi tried all the tricks he knew: dives, tight turns and climbs but the Spitfire remained steadily attached to his tail following every move and then opened fire. Salvi's Re.2005 was struck by many bullets and Salvi was sure he was going to be killed when the Spitfire just as suddenly vanished, possibly out of ammunition. Fuel levels and pilots skill probably were the deciding factor in this incident.

On 25 August de Prato carried out test dives at Guidonia. He then flew the aircraft back to Reggio Emilia where three more dives were made on 27, 29 and 31 August. According to De Prato's account, the tests concluded that the "shaking" began at  true air speed and that they were caused by inadequate dynamic balancing of the empennage, the balance likely lost during full excursion rudder maneuvers performed during dives. After correcting the balancing, de Prato dived the aircraft to  TAS convincing himself that the structure of the Re.2005 was fully capable of high g maneuvers. De Prato wrote, "Our pilots were used to small rudder control surfaces, such those of Macchis and Messerschmitts; with such aircraft full excursion rudder movements were not a problem".

With the armistice on 8 September 1943, some of the few surviving Re.2005s were destroyed by their pilots to prevent them from falling into German hands. Six aircraft were used as trainers by the Aeronautica Nazionale Repubblicana (ANR) the air force of the German allied Italian Social Republic). About thirteen Re.2005s were seized by Germany and some sources have these aircraft in use during late 1943 by the Luftwaffe for air defense against Allied bombing raids over Berlin; others believe that the Re.2005s were used by the Germans in Romania as interceptors over the Ploiești oil fields. Other research indicates that the aircraft probably never left Italy; on 18 March 1944, three aircraft of the Luftdienst Kommando Italien (M.M.096100, 096106, 096110) were severely damaged at Maniago by a U.S. air raid, while at least three others suffered accidents at Maniago (096108: 16 March 1944, 096100: 1 June 1944) and Airasca (19 April 1944) and were returned to Reggiane for repairs. As late as 31 July 1944, five Re.2005 were listed in service with the Flieger Ziel Staffel 20, which operated them from June to December 1944.

German tests at the Rechlin test center concluded that the aircraft "curved well, rolled like the Bf 109 G-4 with rudder forces a little less".

Grp Cpt. Duncan Smith, DSO, DFC, a British fighter pilot and fighter leader of World War II, greatly respected the Re.2005,

It seems that one of the two Reggiane that had returned to Sicily was captured by the United States Army Air Forces and sent to the US. Little is known of this aircraft, which vanished after the war. While German and some Japanese aircraft were extensively tested, the few captured Italian aircraft (another extant example is a captured Macchi C.202) were not known to be tested, so detailed information about them and their flight characteristics is scarce. Sweden was interested in the Re.2005 (already producing the DB-605 under licence) but the order for 50 airframes was never finalized. Total production included two prototypes used as preproduction aircraft which later saw combat service, 48 series production, three prototypes sent to the Luftwaffe for evaluation and one evaluation aircraft at the factory.

Concepts and advanced projects

A request by the German Ministry of Aviation led to one Re.2005 (MM.495), known as the Reggiane Re.2005 "LW", to be modified to German standards for tests in late July 1943. It was evaluated first in Guidonia and later at the Rechlin airfield.

A prototype of the follow-on Re.2006 was almost completed before September 1943 but not flown. Only the G.56 was flown with this engine. A twin-fuselage version and a motorjet variant, the R.2005R were considered. This aircraft project was not considered as a serious alternative to the Re.2006.

Operators

 Luftwaffe operated captured aircraft.

 Regia Aeronautica

 Aeronautica Nazionale Repubblicana

Specifications

See also

References

Citations

Bibliography
 Alegi, Gregory. Ali d'Italia 16: Reggiane Re 2005(in Italian/English). Turin, Italy: La Bancarella Aeronautica, 2001. ISBN unknown.
 Angelucci, Enzo and Paolo Matricardi. World Aircraft: World War II, Volume I (Sampson Low Guides). Maidenhead, UK: Sampson Low, 1978.
 Brindley, John F. "Caproni Reggiane Re 2001 Falco II, Re 2002 Ariete & Re 2005 Sagittario". Aircraft in Profile, Volume 13. Windsor, Berkshire, UK: Profile publications Ltd., 1973, pp. 217–241. .
 Di Terlizzi, Maurizio. Reggiane Re 2005 Sagittario, Aviolibri 4 (in Italian). Rome, Italy: IBN Editore, 2001. .
 Govi, S. Dal Re.2002 al Re.2005 (in Italian). Milan, Italy: Giorgio Apostolo Editore (GAE), 1984.

 Matricardi, Paolo. Aerei militari: Caccia e Ricognitori Volume 1(in Italian). Milano Mondadori Electa, 2006.
 Mondey, David. The Hamlyn Concise Guide to Axis Aircraft of World War II. London: Bounty Books, 2006. .
 Punka, George. Reggiane Fighters in Action, Aircraft number 177. Carrollton, Texas: Squadron/Signal Publications, Inc., 2001. .
 Sgarlato, Nico. "Reggiane: i Caccia Italiani più Belli  ("Reggiane: the Best Looking Italian Fighters) (in Italian)." I Grandi Aerei Storici, N. 17, July 2005. Delta Editrice. . Note: This source includes all the Reggiane fighters, included projected versions.
 Smith, G/C Duncan, W.G.G., DSO DFC RAF(Ret). Spitfire into Battle. Feltham, Middlesex, UK: Hamlyn Paperbacks, 1981. .
 Taylor, John W. R. "Reggiane Re.2005 Sagittario (Archer)". Combat Aircraft of the World from 1909 to the Present. New York: G.P. Putnam's Sons, 1969. .

Reggiane aircraft
World War II Italian fighter aircraft
1940s Italian fighter aircraft
Low-wing aircraft
Single-engined tractor aircraft
Aircraft first flown in 1942